Park Maeng-woo (born December 6, 1951) is a South Korean politician who formerly served as Mayor of Ulsan from 2002 to 2014.

Education 
 1980: Graduated from Kookmin University with a degree in political science
 2001: Graduated from the Political Science Graduate School at Kyungnam University, receiving a master's degree in political science
 2006: Graduated from Dong-eui University, receiving a PhD in political science

See also

References

External links 
 Official home page 
 Official home page 

Mayors of places in South Korea
1951 births
Living people
People from Ulsan
Liberty Korea Party politicians
Republic of Korea Army personnel